The traditional Chinese time systems refers to the time standards for divisions of the day used in China until the introduction of the Shixian calendar in 1628 at the beginning of the Qing dynasty.

Han-era system
The third chapter of the Huainanzi outlines 15 hours during daylight. These are dawn, morning light, daybreak, early meal, feast meal, before noon, noon, short shadow, evening, long shadow, high setting, lower setting(), sunset, twilight, rest time. These are correlated to each hour from 06:00 to 20:00 on the 24-hour clock.

Eastern Han to Ming system
This system used two standards to measure the time in a solar day. Times during daylight were measured in the Shí-kè standard, and at night were measured using the Gēng-diǎn standard.

During daylight: Shí-kè
The Shí-kè ( - ) system is derived from the position of the sun.

Dual hour: Shí
These dual hours are named after the earthly branches in order, with midnight in the first shí. This first shí traditionally occurred from 23:00 to 01:00 on the 24-hour clock with midnight in the middle of the first shí, but was changed during the Song dynasty so that the first shí fell from 00:00 to 02:00 with midnight at the beginning of it.

Starting from the end of the Tang Dynasty into the Song Dynasty, each shí was divided into two, with the first half of each shí called the initial hour and the second called the central hour. Using the change of the midnight hour and the first shí above, you could say that during the Song Dynasty midnight went from the central hour of the first shí to the initial hour of the first shí.

One-hundredth of a day: Kè 
Days were also divided into smaller units, called kè. Kè literally means "mark" or "engraving", referring to the marks placed on sundials or water clocks to help keep time.

Every shí will contain 8 kè, with 7 or 8 full kè and partial beginning and/or ending kè. These fractional kè are multiples of  kè, or 2 minutes 24 seconds. The 7 or 8 full kè within each shí were referred to as "major kè". Each  of a kè was called a "minor kè".

Describing the time during daylight
Both shí and kè would be used to describe the time accurately. There are two ways of doing this.
Eight kè mode. Before the Tang dynasty, the shí were noted first, then each of the major kè were counted up to 8. 
As an example, counting by major kè from the first shí to the second would look like this: zǐ, zǐ 1 kè, zǐ 2 kè, zǐ 3 kè, zǐ 4 kè, zǐ 5 kè, zǐ 6 kè, zǐ 7 kè, zǐ 8 kè, chǒu.. 
Given the time xū 1 kè, this would be read as "1 kè after xū shí", making the time 20:09:36.
Four kè mode. After the Tang dynasty's introduction of "initial" and "central" parts of the shí, the shí was still noted first, but with an added description of which half of the shí the kè was taking place in. Since this narrowed the range of the possible major kè down to four, it was only necessary to specify the major kè between one and four. 
 This would change our first example above to look like this: zǐ initial, zǐ initial 1 kè , zǐ initial 2 kè, zǐ initial 3 kè, zǐ initial 4 kè, zǐ central, zǐ central 1 kè, zǐ central 2 kè, zǐ central 3 kè, zǐ central 4 kè, chǒu initial.
Given the time sì central 3 kè, this would be read as "the third kè in the second half of sì", making the time 11:31:12.

Smaller time units

Fēn
Kè were subdivided into smaller units, called fēn. Using this definition, one fēn is equal to 14.4 seconds.

Miǎo
In 1280, Guo Shoujing's Shòushí Calendar had each fēn subdivided into 100 miǎo. Using the definition of fēn as 14.4 seconds, each miǎo was 144 milliseconds long.

Shùn and niàn

Each fen was subdivided into shùn, and shùn were subdivided into niàn.

The Mahāsāṃghika, translated into Chinese as the Móhēsēngzhī Lǜ (Taishō Tripiṭaka 1425) describes several units of time, including shùn or shùnqǐng and niàn. According to this text, niàn is the smallest unit of time at 18 milliseconds and a shùn is 360 milliseconds.

During night: Gēng-diǎn system
The Gēng-diǎn ( - ) system uses predetermined signals to define the time during the night.

One-tenth of a day: Gēng

Gēng is a time signal given by drum or gong. The drum was sounded by the drum tower in city centers, and by night watchman hitting a gong in other areas. The character for gēng , literally meaning "rotation" or "watch", comes from the rotation of watchmen sounding these signals.

The first gēng theoretically comes at sundown, but was standardized to fall at yǒu shí central 1 kè, or 19:12.

The 5 gēngs in the night are numbered from one to five: yì gēng (alternately chū gēng for "initial watch"); èr gēng;  sān gēng; sì gēng; and  wǔ gēng. The 5 gēngs in daytime are named after times of day listed in the Book of Sui, which describes the legendary Yellow Emperor dividing the day and night into ten equal parts. They are morning;  midmorning,; noon,;  afternoon;  and evening.

As a 10-part system, the gēng are strongly associated with the 10 celestial stems, especially since the stems are used to count off the gēng during the night in Chinese literature.

One-sixtieth of a day: Diǎn
Diǎn, or point, marked when the bell time signal was rung. The time signal was released by the drum tower or local temples.

Every sixth diǎn falls on the gēng, with the rest evenly dividing every gēng into 6 equal parts.

Describing the time during the night
Gēng and diǎn were used together to precisely describe the time at night.

Counting from the first gēng to the next would look like this: yìgēng, yìgēng 1 diǎn, yìgēng 2 diǎn, yìgēng 3 diǎn, yìgēng 4 diǎn, yìgēng 5 diǎn, èrgēng.
Given the time sāngēng 2 diǎn, you would read it as "two diǎn after sāngēng", and find the time to be 00:48.

The night length is inconsistent during a year. The nineteenth volume of the Book of Sui says that at the winter solstice, a day was measured to be 60% night, and at the summer solstice, only 40% night. The official start of night thus had a variation from 0 to 1 gēng.

This variation was handled in different ways. From the start of the Western Han dynasty in 206 BC until 102 AD, yìgēng was moved back one kè every 9th day from the winter solstice to the summer solstice, and moved forward one kè every 9th day from summer solstice to the winter solstice. The Xia Calendar, introduced in 102 AD, added or subtracted a kè to the start of night whenever the sun moved 2.5° north or south from its previous position.

Traditional units in context

Modern applications

Chinese still uses characters from these systems to describe time, even though China has changed to the UTC standards of hours, minutes, and seconds.

Shí is still used to describe the hour. Because of the potential for confusion, xiǎoshí (literally "small hour") is sometimes used for the hour as part of a 24-hour cycle, and shíchen is used for the hour as part of the old 12-hour cycle.

Diǎn is also used interchangeably with shí for the hour. It can also be used to talk about the time on the hour—for example, 8 o' clock is written as 8 diǎn.

Fēn is also used for minutes. To avoid confusion, sometimes the word fēnzhōng (literally "clock minute") is used to clarify that one is talking about modern minutes. The time 09:45 can thus be written as "9 shí, 45 fēn" or "9 diǎn, 45 fēn".

Their usage is similar to using "quarter hour" for 15 minutes or "half an hour" for 30 minutes in English. For example, 6:45 can be written as "6 diǎn, 3 kè".

Miǎo is now the standard term for a second. Like fēn, it is sometimes written as miǎozhōng (literally "clock second") to clarify that someone is talking about modern seconds.

See also 
 Chinese calendar
 Decimal time
 Hour
 Date and time notation in Asia
 Chinese units of measurement
 Chinese Buddhism, the texts from which the smallest units of traditional Chinese time are derived

Notes

References

Bibliography 
 
 

Calendar
Specific calendars
Metrication
Decimal time
Time measurement systems
Units of time
Timekeeping